Breakpoint is a cyberpunk science fiction novel by former United States intelligence and counterterrorism official Richard A. Clarke.  It is his second novel. The book paints a dystopic prediction of the future.

Plot
A series of explosions occur at seemingly unimportant sites in the United States. These sites happen to be the locations where transatlantic cables from Europe and Asia reach the U.S. essentially cutting the U.S. off from the world, at least via the Internet. The attacks are immediately blamed on the Chinese. Two investigators are sent to investigate the incidents, with this assumption in mind. The investigators soon uncover an underground science of genomics and nanotechnology working on human-computer integration.

Reception
It was featured on the Colbert Report.

References

2007 American novels
2007 science fiction novels
American science fiction novels
Cyberpunk novels
Dystopian novels
G. P. Putnam's Sons books